Arturo Sarukhán Casamitjana (born 14 September 1963) is a former ambassador of Mexico to the United States.  A consultant and public speaker, he is also a nonresident senior fellow at The Brookings Institution, an adjunct professor at the Elliott School of International Affairs at George Washington University, a distinguished visiting professor at the Annenberg School of Public Diplomacy at the University of Southern California, and a Global Fellow at the Woodrow Wilson Center's Mexico Institute. He writes a biweekly column in Mexico City's El Universal newspaper and frequently publishes op-eds in U.S. media outlets. He also participates in a weekly Mexican television newscast on Milenio TV and a weekly radio segment on Enfoque Noticias.

Ambassador Sarukhán served as a career diplomat in the Mexican Foreign Service for 22 years, receiving the rank of career ambassador in 2006.  From 2007 to 2013, he served as Mexico's ambassador to the United States.

In October 2009, Sarukhán became the first ambassador in Washington, D.C. to use Twitter in an official capacity as a public diplomacy and outreach and engagement tool. He tweets under the handle @arturo_sarukhan.

Sarukhán is a member of the Inter-American Dialogue.

Background
His grandfather, Artur Sarukhanian, was a Russian Armenian aide to the 2nd Minister-Chairman of the Russian Provisional Government, Alexander Kerensky. After Kerensky was overthrown by the Bolsheviks, Sarukhanian moved to Venice, Italy where he trained at the Mechitarist seminary. Sarukhán's grandmother fled to Thessaloniki, Greece during the Armenian genocide, then moved to Venice, where she met and later married Sarukhanian. Shortly after Benito Mussolini came to power, they left Italy for Mexico.

On his mother's side, Sarukhán is a descendant of Spanish Republican refugees. The Casamitjanas, a Catalan family, crossed the Pyrenees into France at the end of the Civil War and after the fall of Barcelona, and were held in a French concentration camp. They sought asylum in Mexico, when then President Lázaro Cárdenas welcomed thousands of Spanish Republicans who fled after the victory of Francisco Franco's fascist forces.

Education and career

Sarukhán graduated from El Colegio de México with a bachelor's degree in International Relations and received a master's degree in U.S. Foreign Policy at the School of Advanced International Studies (SAIS) of Johns Hopkins University in Washington, D.C., where he studied as a Fulbright scholar and Ford Foundation Fellow. In 1988–1989, before joining Mexico's Foreign Service, Sarukhán served as the Executive Secretary of the Commission for the Future of Mexico-US relations, a non-governmental initiative funded by the Ford Foundation to recast the Mexico-US relationship.

He has served in different posts at the Secretariat of Foreign Affairs. In 1991, he was Deputy Assistant Secretary for Inter-American Affairs and during that period he also represented Mexico at the Agency for the Prohibition of Nuclear Weapons in Latin America and the Caribbean (OPANAL). In 1993, he was posted to the Embassy of Mexico in Washington DC and was the Chief of Staff to the Ambassador, during the NAFTA negotiations. In 1995 he was put in charge of the office for anti-narcotics in the same diplomatic mission. In 2000–2003, Sarukhán was designated Chief of Policy Planning to the Secretary of Foreign Affairs, and served as Consul General in New York City in 2003–2006.

As an academic, he has taught several courses at the Instituto Tecnológico Autónomo de México (ITAM), at the National Defense College, at the Inter-American Defense College, the National Defense University, and The George Washington University in the United States.

On 3 February 2006, he requested a leave of absence from the Foreign Service and left his post at the Consulate General in New York City to join Felipe Calderón's presidential campaign as international spokesperson and coordinator of foreign affairs.

He was appointed Ambassador to the United States on 27 January 2007.

References

External links
 sarukhanassoc.com
 Embassy of Mexico to the USA bio
 Brookings bio
 Wilson Center bio

1963 births
Living people
Ambassadors of Mexico to the United States
El Colegio de México alumni
Ethnic Armenian politicians
Ford Foundation fellowships
Members of the Inter-American Dialogue
Mexican people of Armenian descent
Mexican people of Catalan descent
Paul H. Nitze School of Advanced International Studies alumni